Solon Bluch Sudduth (April 2, 1908 – July 18, 1963) was an American football and basketball coach. He served as the head football coach at Henderson State Teachers College—now known as Henderson State University—from 1935 to 1938, compiling a record of 8–22–2. Sudduth was the head basketball coach at Henderson State from 1935 to 1939, tallying a mark of 32–22. He was also a health educator.

Head coaching record

Football

References

1908 births
1963 deaths
Basketball coaches from Alabama
Henderson State Reddies athletic directors
Henderson State Reddies football coaches
Henderson State Reddies men's basketball coaches
People from Carbon Hill, Alabama